Hærland is a village in the municipality of Eidsberg, Norway.

Villages in Østfold